Harlem is an unincorporated community in Harlem Township, Delaware County, in the U.S. state of Ohio.

History
Harlem was platted in 1849 and named for its location within Harlem Township. A post office was established at Harlem in 1830, and remained in operation until 1907.

References

Unincorporated communities in Delaware County, Ohio
Unincorporated communities in Ohio